On This Day ... Live At The Vanguard is an album recorded live in September 2002 at the famous Village Vanguard by Joe Lovano with his award-winning nonet. It was released on July 8, 2003 via Blue Note label.

Track listing
 "At the Vanguard" – 9:33
 "Focus" – 8:12
 "After the Rain" – 7:39
 "Good Bait" – 14:13
 "Laura – 5:26
 "On This Day (Just Like Any Other)" – 15:26
 "My Little Brown Book" – 9:07

Personnel
Larry Farrell – trombone
George Garzone – tenor saxophone
John Hicks – piano
Dennis Irwin – bass
Ralph Lalama – tenor saxophone
Joe Lovano – tenor saxophone
Lewis Nash – drums
Barry Ries – trumpet
Scott Robinson – baritone saxophone
Steve Slagle – alto saxophone

References

External links
 

2002 live albums
Joe Lovano live albums
Blue Note Records live albums
Albums recorded at the Village Vanguard